Maurice Hugh Frederick Wilkins  (15 December 1916 – 5 October 2004) was a New Zealand-born British biophysicist and Nobel laureate whose research spanned multiple areas of physics and biophysics, contributing to the scientific understanding of phosphorescence, isotope separation, optical microscopy and X-ray diffraction, and to the development of radar. He is known for his work at King's College London on the structure of DNA.

Wilkins' work on DNA falls into two distinct phases. The first was in 1948–1950, when his initial studies produced the first clear X-ray images of DNA, which he presented at a conference in Naples in 1951 attended by James Watson. During the second phase, 1951–52, Wilkins produced clear "B form" "X" shaped images from squid sperm, images he sent to James Watson and Francis Crick, causing Watson to write "Wilkins... has obtained extremely excellent X-ray diffraction photographs" [of DNA].

In 1953, Wilkins' group coordinator Sir John Randall instructed Raymond Gosling to hand over to Wilkins a high-quality image of "B" form DNA (Photo 51), which Raymond Gosling had made in 1952, after which his supervisor Rosalind Franklin "put it aside" as she was leaving King's College London. Wilkins showed it to Watson. This image, along with the knowledge that Linus Pauling had proposed an incorrect structure of DNA, "mobilised" Watson and Crick to restart model building. With additional information from research reports of Wilkins and Franklin, obtained via Max Perutz, Watson and Crick correctly described the double-helix structure of DNA in 1953.

Wilkins continued to test, verify, and make significant corrections to the Watson–Crick DNA model and to study the structure of RNA. Wilkins, Crick, and Watson were awarded the 1962 Nobel Prize for Physiology or Medicine, "for their discoveries concerning the molecular structure of nucleic acids and its significance for information transfer in living material".

Early life and education

Wilkins was born in Pongaroa, New Zealand, where his father, Edgar Henry Wilkins, was a medical doctor. His older sister was the translator and poet Eithne Wilkins. His family had come from Dublin, where his paternal and maternal grandfathers were, respectively, Headmaster of Dublin High School and a Chief of Police. The Wilkinses moved to Birmingham, England when Maurice was 6. Later, he attended Wylde Green College and then went to King Edward's School, Birmingham from 1929 to 1934.

Wilkins went to St John's College, Cambridge in 1935; he studied the Natural Sciences Tripos, specialising in Physics, and received a Bachelor of Arts degree in 1938. Mark Oliphant, who was one of Wilkins' instructors at St. John's, had been appointed to the Chair of Physics at the University of Birmingham, and had appointed John Randall to his staff. Wilkins became a PhD student of Randall at the University of Birmingham. In 1945, they published four papers in the Proceedings of the Royal Society on phosphorescence and electron traps. Wilkins received a PhD for this work in 1940.

Career and research

Post war years: 1945–1950
During World War II Wilkins developed improved radar screens at Birmingham, then worked on isotope separation at the Manhattan Project at the University of California, Berkeley during the years 1944–45.

Meanwhile, Randall had been appointed to the Chair of Physics at the University of St Andrews. In 1945, he appointed Wilkins as Assistant Lecturer in his department at the University of St Andrews. Randall was negotiating with the Medical Research Council (MRC) to set up a laboratory to apply the experimental methods of physics to problems of biology. The combination of these disciplines as biophysics was a novel idea. The MRC told Randall that this had to be done in another university. In 1946 Randall was appointed Wheatstone Professor of Physics, in charge of the entire Physics department at King's College, London, with the funding to set up a Biophysics Unit. He brought Wilkins with him as Assistant Director of the unit. They appointed a team of scientists trained in both the physical and biological sciences. The "management philosophy" was to explore the use of many techniques in parallel, to find which looked promising, and then to focus on these. Wilkins, as the scientist with most diverse experience of physics and Assistant Director of the unit, had general oversight of the varied projects besides direct involvement in his personal research projects that included new types of optical microscopy. King's College received funding to build completely new Physics and Engineering Departments where vaults beneath the Strand level College forecourt had been destroyed by bombs during the War. The Biophysics Unit, several more experimental physics groups and the theoretical group started to move in, during the early months of 1952. The laboratories were opened formally by Lord Cherwell on 27 June. Wilkins' article for Nature described both departments, consistent with his leadership role and prestige within the college at large.

DNA  – Phase One

At King's College, Wilkins pursued, among other things, X-ray diffraction work on ram sperm and DNA that had been obtained from calf thymus by the Swiss scientist Rudolf Signer. The DNA from Signer's lab was much more intact than the DNA which had previously been isolated. Wilkins discovered that it was possible to produce thin threads from this concentrated DNA solution that contained highly ordered arrays of DNA suitable for the production of X-ray diffraction patterns. Using a carefully bundled group of these DNA threads and keeping them hydrated, Wilkins and a graduate student Raymond Gosling obtained X-ray photographs of DNA that showed that the long, thin DNA molecule in the sample from Signer had a regular, crystal-like structure in these threads. Gosling later said "When... I first saw all those discrete diffraction spots ...emerging on the film in the developing dish was a truly eureka moment....we realised that if DNA was the gene material then we had just shown that genes could crystallize!" This initial X-ray diffraction work at King's College was done in May or June 1950. It was one of the X-ray diffraction photographs taken in 1950, shown at a meeting in Naples a year later, that sparked James Watson's interest in DNA causing him to write "suddenly I was excited about chemistry.....I began to wonder whether it would be possible for me to join Wilkins in working on DNA". At that time Wilkins also introduced Francis Crick to the importance of DNA. Crick advised him to work on proteins telling Wilkins "what you ought to do is find yourself a good protein". Wilkins knew that proper experiments on the threads of purified DNA would require better X-ray equipment. Wilkins ordered a new X-ray tube and a new microcamera. He also suggested to Randall that the soon-to-be-appointed Rosalind Franklin should be reassigned from work on protein solutions to join the DNA effort.

By the summer of 1950 Randall had arranged for a three-year research fellowship that would fund Rosalind Franklin in his laboratory. Franklin was delayed in finishing her work in Paris. Late in 1950, Randall wrote to Franklin to inform her that rather than work on protein, she should take advantage of Wilkins's preliminary work and that she should do X-ray studies of DNA fibers made from Signer's samples of DNA.

DNA Phase two 1951–52 

Early in 1951 Franklin finally arrived. Wilkins was away on holiday and missed an initial meeting at which Raymond Gosling stood in for him along with Alex Stokes, who, like Crick, would solve the basic mathematics that make possible a general theory of how helical structures diffract X-rays. No work had been done on DNA in the laboratory for several months; the new X-ray tube sat unused, waiting for Franklin. Franklin ended up with the DNA from Signer, Gosling became her PhD student, and she had the expectation that DNA X-ray diffraction work was her project. Wilkins returned to the laboratory expecting, on the other hand, that Franklin would be his collaborator and that they would work together on the DNA project that he had started. The confusion over Franklin's and Wilkins' roles in relation to the DNA effort (which later developed into considerable tension between them) is clearly attributable to Randall. In his letter of appointment he told Franklin "as far as the experimental X-ray effort [on DNA] is concerned, there will be at the moment only yourself and Gosling". However, Randall never informed Wilkins of his decision to give Franklin sole responsibility for the DNA effort and Wilkins only learned of the letter years after Franklin's death. He later wrote "My opinion is very clear: that Randall was very wrong to have written to Rosalind telling her that Stokes and I wished to stop our work on DNA, without consulting us. After Raymond [Gosling] and I got a clear crystalline X-ray pattern I was very eager to continue that work ... Trying to understand 'what really happened' when a very admirable scientist [Randall] models himself on Napoleon is not easy ... [but the letter] was very damaging to her and to me".

By November 1951, Wilkins had evidence that DNA in cells as well as purified DNA had a helical structure. Alex Stokes had solved the basic mathematics of helical diffraction theory and thought that Wilkins's X-ray diffraction data indicated a helical structure in DNA. Wilkins met with Watson and Crick and told them about his results. This information from Wilkins, along with additional information gained by Watson when he heard Franklin talk about her research during a King's College research meeting, stimulated Watson and Crick to create their first molecular model of DNA, a model with the phosphate backbones at the center. Upon viewing the model of the proposed structure, Franklin told Watson and Crick that it was wrong. Franklin based this on two observations. First, experiments by J.M. Gulland showed that the CO- and NH2 groups of the bases could not be titrated, and so were probably inaccessible. Secondly, crystallographic evidence showed that the structural units of DNA were progressively separated by the addition of water, leading to the formation of a gel and then a solution. Franklin believed that the simplest explanation of this was for the hydrophilic part of the molecule to be on the outside. Crick tried to get Wilkins to continue with additional molecular modeling efforts, but Wilkins did not take this approach.

Early in 1952, Wilkins began a series of experiments on sepia sperm which were very encouraging. "I...got much clearer patterns than the previous year.....when I met [Sir William Lawrence] Bragg by chance I showed him the pattern [which] very clearly offered strong evidence for a helical structure for DNA....the sharp sperm patterns were very inspiring, and had the special interest that sperm were real live objects and not just purified DNA extracted by chemists from living material". Wilkins was particularly interested in whether living samples would yield meaningful X-ray diffraction patterns – his results showed they could.

During 1952, Franklin also refused to participate in molecular modeling efforts and continued to work on step-by-step detailed analysis of her X-ray diffraction data (Patterson synthesis). By the spring of 1952, Franklin had received permission from Randall to ask to transfer her fellowship so that she could leave King's College and work in John Bernal's laboratory at Birkbeck College, also in London. Franklin remained at King's College until the middle of March 1953.

Linus Pauling had published a proposed but incorrect structure of DNA, making the same basic error that Watson and Crick had made a year earlier. Some of those working on DNA in the United Kingdom feared that Pauling would quickly solve the DNA structure once he recognized his error and put the backbones of the nucleotide chains on the outside of a model of DNA. After March 1952 Franklin concentrated on the X-ray data for the A-form of less hydrated DNA while Wilkins tried to work on the hydrated B-form. Wilkins was handicapped because Franklin had all of the good DNA. Wilkins got new DNA samples, but it was not as good as the original sample he had obtained in 1950 and which Franklin continued to use. Most of his new results were for biological samples like sperm cells, which also suggested a helical structure for DNA. In July 1952 Franklin reported to him and Stokes that her newest results made her doubt the helical nature of the A-form.

In early 1953 Watson visited King's College and Wilkins showed him a high quality image of the B-form X-ray diffraction pattern, now identified as photograph 51, that Franklin had produced in March 1952. Wilkins had shown this image produced by Franklin without notifying or receiving authorization from the principal investigator who produced the image. With the knowledge that Pauling was working on DNA and had submitted a model of DNA for publication, Watson and Crick mounted one more concentrated effort to deduce the structure of DNA. Through Max Perutz, his thesis supervisor, Crick gained access to a progress report from King's College that included useful information from Franklin about the features of DNA she had deduced from her X-ray diffraction data. Watson and Crick published their proposed DNA double helical structure in a paper in the journal Nature in April 1953. In this paper Watson and Crick acknowledged that they had been "stimulated by.... the unpublished results and ideas" of Wilkins and Franklin.

The first Watson-Crick paper appeared in Nature on 25 April 1953. The members of the Cambridge and King's College laboratories agreed to report their interlocking work in three papers with continuous pagination in Nature.

Sir Lawrence Bragg, the director of the Cavendish Laboratory, where Watson and Crick worked, gave a talk at Guy's Hospital Medical School in London on Thursday 14 May 1953 which resulted in an article by Ritchie Calder in the News Chronicle of London, on Friday 15 May 1953, entitled "Why You Are You. Nearer Secret of Life." The news reached readers of The New York Times the next day; Victor K. McElheny, in researching his biography of Watson, Watson and DNA: Making a Scientific Revolution, found a clipping of a six-paragraph New York Times article written from London and dated 16 May 1953 with the headline "Form of 'Life Unit' in Cell Is Scanned." The article ran in an early edition and was then pulled to make space for news deemed more important. (The New York Times subsequently ran a longer article on 12 June 1953). The Cambridge University undergraduate newspaper Varsity also ran its own short article on the discovery on Saturday 30 May 1953. Bragg's original announcement at a Solvay conference on proteins in Belgium on 8 April 1953 went unreported by the press.

Post-1953
Following the initial 1953 series of publications on the double helix structure of DNA, Wilkins continued research as leader of a team that performed a range of meticulous experiments to establish the helical model as valid among different biological species, as well as in living systems, to establish the universality of the double helix structure. He became deputy director of the MRC Biophysics Unit at King's in 1955, and succeeded Randall as director of the unit from 1970 to 1972.

Awards and honours

Wilkins was elected a Fellow of the Royal Society (FRS) in 1959 and an EMBO Member in 1964.

In 1960 he was presented with the American Public Health Association's Albert Lasker Award, and in 1962 he was made a Commander of the Order of the British Empire. Also in 1962 he shared the Nobel Prize in Physiology or Medicine with Watson and Crick for the discovery of the structure of DNA.

From 1969 to 1991, Wilkins was the founding President of the British Society for Social Responsibility in Science.

In 2000, King's College London opened the Franklin-Wilkins Building in honour of Dr. Franklin's and Professor Wilkins' work at the college.

The wording on the DNA sculpture (donated by James Watson) outside Clare College's Thirkill Court, Cambridge, England is

a) on the base:
i) "These strands unravel during cell reproduction. Genes are encoded in the sequence of bases."
ii) "The double helix model was supported by the work of Rosalind Franklin and Maurice Wilkins."

b) on the helices:
i) "The structure of DNA was discovered in 1953 by Francis Crick and James Watson while Watson lived here at Clare."
ii) "The molecule of DNA has two helical strands that are linked by base pairs Adenine – Thymine or Guanine – Cytosine."

The Centre for Molecular Biodiscovery at the University of Auckland, launched in 2002, was renamed the Maurice Wilkins Centre in 2006.

Personal life
Wilkins was married twice.  His first wife, Ruth, was an art student whom he met whilst he was at Berkeley.  Their marriage ended in divorce, and Ruth bore her son by Wilkins after their divorce. Wilkins married his second wife Patricia Ann Chidgey in 1959. They had four children, Sarah, George, Emily and William.  His widow Patricia and the children from their marriage survived him.

In the years before World War II, he was an anti-war activist, joining the Cambridge Scientists Anti-War Group. He joined the Communist Party, until the invasion of Poland by the Soviet Army in September 1939. Formerly classified UK security service papers reveal that Wilkins came under suspicion of leaking atomic secrets. The files, released in August 2010, indicate surveillance of Wilkins ended by 1953. "After the war I wondered what I would do, as I was very disgusted with the dropping of two bombs on civilian centres in Japan," he told Britain's Encounter radio program in 1999.

Wilkins published his autobiography, The Third Man of the Double Helix, in 2003.

References

Books featuring Maurice Wilkins

 Maurice Wilkins, The Third Man of the Double Helix: The Autobiography of Maurice Wilkins.  Oxford University Press
 Robert Olby; "Wilkins, Maurice Hugh Frederick (1916–2004)", Oxford Dictionary of National Biography, online edn, Oxford University Press, Jan 2008
 Robert Olby; "Francis Crick: Hunter of Life's Secrets", Cold Spring Harbor Laboratory Press, published in August 2009.
 John Finch; A Nobel Fellow on Every Floor, Medical Research Council 2008, 381 pp, ; this book is all about the MRC Laboratory of Molecular Biology, Cambridge
 Robert Olby; The Path to The Double Helix: Discovery of DNA; first published in October 1974 by MacMillan, with foreword by Francis Crick; ; the definitive DNA textbook, revised in 1994, with a 9-page postscript.
 Horace Freeland Judson, The Eighth Day of Creation. Makers of the Revolution in Biology; CSHL Press 1996 .
 Watson, James D. The Double Helix: A Personal Account of the Discovery of the Structure of DNA; The Norton Critical Edition, which was published in 1980, edited by Gunther S. Stent:.
 Chomet, S. (Ed.), D.N.A. Genesis of a Discovery, 1994, Newman- Hemisphere Press, London; NB a few copies are available from Newman-Hemisphere at 101 Swan Court, London SW3 5RY.
 Maddox, Brenda, Rosalind Franklin: The Dark Lady of DNA, 2002. .
 Sayre, Anne 1975. Rosalind Franklin and DNA. New York: W.W. Norton and Company. .
 Crick, Francis, 1990. What Mad Pursuit: A Personal View of Scientific Discovery (Basic Books reprint edition) 
 Watson, James D., The Double Helix: A Personal Account of the Discovery of the Structure of DNA, Atheneum, 1980,  (first published in 1968)
 Krude, Torsten (Ed.) DNA Changing Science and Society: The Darwin Lectures for 2003 CUP 2003, includes a lecture by Sir Aaron Klug on Rosalind Franklin's involvement in the determination of the structure of DNA.
 Ridley, Matt; "Francis Crick: Discoverer of the Genetic Code (Eminent Lives)" was first published in June 2006 in the US and then in the UK September 2006, by HarperCollins Publishers; 192 pp, ; this short book is in the publisher's "Eminent Lives" series.
 Light Is A Messenger, the life and science of William Lawrence Bragg by Graeme Hunter, ; Oxford University Press, 2004.
 Designs For Life: Molecular Biology After World War II by Soraya de Chadarevian; CUP 2002, 444 pp; ; it includes James Watson's "well kept open secret" from April 2003!
 Tait, Sylvia & James Francis Tait. A Quartet of Unlikely Discoveries (Athena Press 2004) 

 James D. Watson, The Annotated and Illustrated Double Helix, edited by Alexander Gann and Jan Witkowski (2012) Simon & Schuster, .

External links

 
 for the People's Archive/BBC 90 story interview with Crick AND the 236 story interview with Brenner.
  with the Nobel Lecture on 11 December 1961 The Molecular Configuration of Nucleic Acids
 Reading University site on 50th anniversary of Discovery of the structure of DNA. Includes a list of Books on the subject.
 Biography (from the New Zealand Edge)
 Discovery Story in BA Magazine
 DNA: The King's Story detailing Wilkins' involvement in elucidating the structure of DNA
 DNA and Social Responsibility Project: Archiving Maurice Wilkin's Personal Papers
 List of classic papers in Nature on DNA structure
 Listen to Francis Crick and James Watson talking on the BBC
 For reproduction of the original text in June 1953 (PDF)
 for Lynne Elkins' article on Franklin.
 New York Times 50th anniversary series of excellent articles.
 The first American newspaper coverage of the discovery of the DNA structure: Saturday, 13 June 1953 The New York Times (PDF)
 Listen to an oral history interview with Maurice Wilkins – a life story interview recorded for National Life Stories at the British Library

1916 births
2004 deaths
Academics of King's College London
Alumni of St John's College, Cambridge
Alumni of the University of Birmingham
Commanders of the Order of the British Empire
English biophysicists
English Nobel laureates
English physicists
Fellows of King's College London
New Zealand Fellows of the Royal Society
Manhattan Project people
Members of the European Molecular Biology Organization
New Zealand molecular biologists
Naturalised citizens of the United Kingdom
New Zealand emigrants to the United Kingdom
New Zealand scientists
Nobel laureates in Physiology or Medicine
People educated at King Edward's School, Birmingham
Radar pioneers
University of California, Berkeley faculty
Recipients of the Albert Lasker Award for Basic Medical Research
New Zealand Nobel laureates
British molecular biologists